Lawrence is a temporarily closed 'L' station on the Chicago Transit Authority's Red Line. It is an elevated station located at 1117 West Lawrence Avenue in the Uptown neighborhood of Chicago, Illinois. Four tracks pass through the station, though the two eastern tracks are out of service for reconstruction, with a single island platform in the center of the tracks; Purple Line weekday rush hour express service use the outside tracks and do not stop.
 
Lawrence station is located in the historic Uptown entertainment district. Nearby attractions include the Aragon Ballroom, the Green Mill Cocktail Lounge, the Riviera Theater, and the Uptown Theatre.

History
Lawrence station opened in 1923, shortly after the Northwestern Elevated Railroad was elevated between Wilson and Howard. The original station house was demolished and replaced with a temporary structure in 1995.

Red & Purple Modernization Project
Closure of the Lawrence station (along with Thorndale, and Jarvis on the Red Line and South Boulevard and Foster on the Purple Line) was proposed in three of the CTA's six potential options for the renovation of the Purple Line and northern section of the Red Line. In two plans, the station would be replaced by a new auxiliary entrance at Ainslie from Argyle, while in the third replacement would be by an auxiliary entrance at Winona from a new subterranean station at Foster.

As part of Phase I of the Red & Purple Modernization Project, the station closed for demolition beginning on May 16, 2021, and a newly constructed station will reopen by December 2024. The new station will feature wider platforms, better lighting, and be accessible to passengers with disabilities.

Bus connections
CTA
 36 Broadway
 81 Lawrence (Owl Service) (Currently re-routed to Wilson during station closure)

Notes and references

Notes 

Station closed until further notice

References

External links

Train schedule (PDF) at CTA official site
Lawrence Station Page CTA official site
Lawrence Avenue entrance from Google Maps Street View

CTA Red Line stations
Railway stations in the United States opened in 1923